Lloyd Clark Fletcher is an Australian convicted rapist and murderer whose most well known crime was the sexual assault and murder of 15 year old Janet Phillips in Wynnum, Queensland on 19 July 1987. He is currently serving an indefinite life sentence without possibility of parole in Queensland. 

Fletcher showed signs of violence in his teenage years towards both female and animals. At the age of 23, Fletcher was found guilty of rape and attempted murder. He went on to murder teenage victim Janet Phillips shortly after being released, though his involvement was not successfully proven until 11 years after the murder. During this time, Fletcher attempted to abduct a 13 year old girl in 1989, and a 16 year old girl in 1997. Fletcher resides in the Wolston Correctional Centre in Brisbane. He has made recent applications to be released following a cancer diagnosis.

Early life 
In his teenage years, Fletcher began to show signs of serious violence towards both women and animals. At the age of 13, Fletcher attacked and attempted to rape a woman, intentionally choosing a bridge to prevent the victim from escaping. Fletcher was charged with aggravated assault and discharged into his mothers care. He would later be charged with the aggravated offence of breaking into the house of a woman ‘with intent’. At age 17, Fletcher was given his first custodial sentence for the shooting of female cows.

Murder of Janet Phillips 
Janet Phillips, (Born 24 March 1972) was a 15 year old student of Wynnum State High School at the time of her death.

Circumstance 
Phillips had been attending the 21st birthday celebration of a family friend with her family. During the party, a fight broke out between her father and a group of males who had attended the party without invitation and caused trouble by doing so. Taken aback by the violence, Phillips decided to walk home of her own accord. 

The following morning, Phillip’s mother noticed she had not returned home, and quickly called police with her concerns. Witnesses informed police they had seen her at around midnight in a street nearby her home on the night she disappeared. At around 4pm the following Sunday afternoon, two boys riding horseback found Phillips deceased near the Gateway Motorway.

Investigation 
The initial investigation focused on those who had been evicted from the party by Phillip’s father, however all of these men were eventually eliminated from the investigation once questioned. Fletcher first came to the attention of investigators when they were reviewing recently released sexual offenders living in the area. Due to his background, Fletcher captured the attention of detectives, however they were unable to substantiate his involvement in her murder. Fletcher had consented to a blood sample, which did match the semen found on vaginal swabs taken from Phillips. However, at the time of the murder, DNA technology had not yet arrived and so only a blood-type match was made which did not sufficiently link Fletcher definitively to the murder. The Queensland Government authorised a $50,000 reward for information leading to the apprehension of Phillip’s murder on 8 August 1998. Fletcher would be charged with the murder 11 years later when DNA technology was developed, enabling investigators to conclude Fletcher was the contributor to the semen found in Phillips.

Conviction and sentence 
The death of Phillips lead to Fletcher being the first recipient of an indefinite life sentence in Queensland. Her death was also the first case in Queensland where DNA technology was used in a criminal conviction.

Other crimes

Rape and attempted murder 

In 1977, Fletcher pleaded guilty to the rape and attempted murder of a young female in Innisfail as she walked across the Jubilee Bridge which crosses the crocodile-infested Johnstone River. Aged 23, Fletcher saw the woman walking home late at night, accosted her, forcibly raped her and punching her unconscious before trying her bra around the neck and dumping her in the Johnston River. The woman regained consciousness in the water, and Fletcher was sentenced to eight years imprisonment for the rape and 15 for the attempted murder.

Kidnapping and reckless injury 
In 1989, Fletcher kidnapped and caused serious injuries to a 13 year old girl In Bright, Victoria. The victim, Donna Rupp was riding her pushbike home in the afternoon when Fletcher surprised Rupp by appearing as she crossed a bridge. Fletcher "yelled at [Rupp] to get off [her] bike and [she] tried to run in the other direction". Vehicles driving past Fletcher and Rupp noticed her injury, and stopped to assist. Rupp mouthed "help me", causing the drivers to assist Rupp and capture Fletcher at gunpoint and convey him to a police station. Following the attack, Fletcher was sentenced to five years imprisonment of which he served three years.

Abduction and bodily harm 
In 1997, Fletcher abducted a 16 year old girl from a train station in Wynnum at knifepoint, punching her unconscious and strangling her. When the woman woke up inside Fletchers car with her wrists now bound, she kicked his car door open and was saved by a group of men passing by.

Fletcher was convicted and sentenced to seven years imprisonment.

Review of indefinite sentence 
In 2011, Fletcher was eligible for a review of his indefinite sentence. At the proceeding, Fletcher told Justice Anthe Philippides he would “rather the indefinite sentence stay as it is”.

Bid for release 
In 2022, Fletcher bid for release citing terminal illness. In response to Fletcher's bid for release, the police officer responsible for charging Fletcher stated Fletcher was "the most dangerous, perverted, sexual offender that [he had] ever come across" calling him "a brutal psychopath" and "wish[ing] him well" but hoping Fletcher "dies in jail".

References 

Australian murderers of children
Australian rapists
1987 murders in Australia
Year of birth missing (living people)
Living people
Murder in Queensland
1980s in Queensland
Australian people convicted of murder